G1 is the sixth studio album by South Korean rapper Eun Ji-won, released on June 27, 2019, through YG Entertainment. This marks Ji-won's first studio album in 10 years since "Platonic" as well as first release as a solo artist since single album "Trauma" in 2015. The album features the lead single "I'm On Fire" (불나방).

Track listing

Charts

Release history

References

2019 albums
YG Entertainment albums
Korean-language albums